Inhabited Island may refer to:

Prisoners of Power (or Inhabited Island), a science fiction novel by Arkady and Boris Strugatsky
The Inhabited Island, a science fiction film directed by Fyodor Bondarchuk based on the novel